Oscar León Navas (born April 4, 1974) is a Colombian former professional boxer who competed from 1996 to 2011. He challenged for the WBA featherweight title in 2003, as the WBA and WBC interim featherweight titles in 2003 and 2006, respectively.

Pro career

WBA Featherweight Championship
In 2003 Oscar lost two very disputed twelve round split-decisions to Derrick Gainer and Chris John for the WBA World Featherweight championship.

Interim WBC Featherweight Championship
On February 17, 2006, León was knocked out by Humberto Soto in the ninth round, for the WBC Featherweight championship.

Professional boxing record

References

External links

Light-welterweight boxers
1974 births
Living people
Colombian male boxers
Sportspeople from Cartagena, Colombia